Nganasania is a genus of beetles belonging to the family Cryptophagidae.

The species of this genus are found in Russia.

Species:
 Nganasania khetica Zherikhin, 1977
 Nganasania taymyrica Lyubarsky & Perkovsky, 2014

References

Cryptophagidae